"Walk This World" is a song by Bermudian singer-songwriter Heather Nova. Released in 1994 as her first single, the song was included on her second studio album, Oyster (1994). This is the song she is most known for, which has led to her being considered a one hit wonder in many countries.

Critical reception
Steve Baltin from Cash Box wrote, "Nova is a new singer/songwriter with a gift for words behind her Tom Petty-like rock riffs. Whereas most female singer/songwriters are being placed on Modern Rock outlets, Nova’s roots are in rock. Yet the crossover success of Jeff Buckley indicates that she will likely find acceptance from those outlets. A strong singer as well. Nova has made a memorable first impression."

Music video
The accompanying music video for "Walk This World" was directed by Zack Snyder, and was filmed all around the world, while Heather plays her guitar and sings the song at the different locations.

Charts

References

External links 
 Music video at YouTube

1994 singles